Paths of Glory is a novel by English author Jeffrey Archer based on the story of George Mallory who died attempting to climb Everest in the 1920s. It was published by St. Martin's Press on 3 March 2009. It fictionally supports the claims that George Mallory, an Englishman, was the first to conquer Mount Everest – before Sir Edmund Hillary and Tenzing Norgay.

Controversy
The novel caused a controversy in New Zealand, with major newspaper The Dominion Post calling it an insult to Sir Edmund Hillary.

Characters
 George Mallory: Professor and climber
 Ruth Mallory: Thackeray Turner's daughter and George's wife
 Reverend Leigh Mallory: George's father
 Annie Mallory: George's mother
 Avie Mallory: George's sister
 Mary Mallory: George's sister
 Trafford Mallory: George's brother
 Guy Bullock: George's best friend
 Mr. Graham Irving: George's teacher
 A. C. Benson: George's teacher at Cambridge
 Geoffrey Winthrop Young: Chairman of the Alpine Club and George's climbing mentor
 George Finch: George's Australian rival at mountain climbing
 Andrew O'Sullivan: Teacher, George's colleague at Charterhouse
 Mr. Thackeray Turner: School governor at Charterhouse
 Marjorie and Mildred Turner: Mr Turner's daughters
 Sandy Irvine: George's final climbing partner
 Mr. Arthur Hinks: Secretary Everest committee
 Brigadier General Bruce: General posted in India
 Sir Edward Norton: Climber
 Howard Somervell: Climber
 Professor Noel Odell: Climber
 Captain John Noel: Climber
 Claire, Beridge and John Mallory: George's children.

Film adaptation
In June 2021, it was announced that a film adaptation of Paths of Glory was in development for a production start in January 2022, with Ewan McGregor, Mark Strong, and Sam Heughan set to star as Mallory, Hinks, and Finch, respectively. Doug Liman will direct and produce the project, with Sheldon Turner writing the screenplay under the title Everest and HanWay Films handling international sales and distribution. Juno Temple joined the cast in September as Ruth Mallory.

References

2009 British novels
Novels by Jeffrey Archer
Mount Everest in fiction
Mountaineering books
Novels set in Tibet
Macmillan Publishers books